National Highway 135 is a national highway of India. It is a branch of National Highway 35.

National Highway 135 (NH135), total length: 130 km (81 mi)

States: Madhya Pradesh, Uttar Pradesh

Route 
NH 135 originates from Mirzapur in Uttar Pradesh and terminates at Mangawan in Madhya Pradesh.

Junctions 

 Junction with NH35 at Mirzapur
 Junction with NH30 at Mangawan

See also 
 List of National Highways in India by highway number

References

National highways in India
National Highways in Uttar Pradesh
National Highways in Madhya Pradesh